Pakistan participated in the 2016 South Asian Games in Guwahati and Shillong, India from 5 February to 16 February 2016.

Medal summary
Pakistan won 12 gold medals from a total of 104 medals.

Medal table

References

Nations at the 2016 South Asian Games
2016